Ljeutrim "Trimi" Makolli (born 7 June 1992) is a Yugoslavian-born Swedish footballer who played as a forward. During the 2009 pre-season, he was moved up from Djurgården's youth team to the senior team.

Makolli debuted for Djurgårdens IF in a friendly match against IK Sirius on 12 February 2009 and also scored a goal in the match. He made his Allsvenskan debut on 24 April 2009 as a substitute against IF Brommapojkarna. In total he played 2 league games and 3 cup games for Djurgården.

References

External links
 

1992 births
Living people
Swedish footballers
Sweden youth international footballers
Allsvenskan players
Djurgårdens IF Fotboll players
Vasalunds IF players
IK Frej players
Association football forwards